Itaka may refer to:
Itaka, Tanzania, an administrative ward in the Mbozi District of the Mbeya Region of Tanzania
Itaka, Russia, an urban-type settlement in Zabaykalsky Krai, Russia